Modern Christian-Democratic Union, was a political party in Lithuania that existed between 1998 and 2003. In 2003 the party joined forces with the Liberal Union of Lithuania (Lietuvos liberalų sąjunga) and the Centre Union of Lithuania (Lietuvos centro sąjunga) to form the Liberal and Centre Union (Liberalų ir centro sąjunga).

Christian democratic parties in Europe
Conservative parties in Lithuania
Defunct political parties in Lithuania
Political parties established in 1998
Political parties disestablished in 2003
1998 establishments in Lithuania